Holy Trinity Church is an Anglican Church in Nailsea, Somerset, England. It dates from the 15th century and is a Grade I listed building. It features a tower with 6 Bells, a cemetery, and a community centre called "The Trinity Centre".

History and architecture

The porch dates from 1712 and was restored in 1861 at the expense of Mr C.E. Evans of Nailsea Court. The four stage tower has a pointed arched west door with two and three-light windows at each level. It is supported with diagonal buttresses and surmounted with a parapet, pinnacles, spire and weathervane.

The Church was significantly refurbished in 2003/2004 to make it more modern and flexible in its usage. The changes included the removal of the pews, being replaced with single movable chairs and the removal of the balcony. New heating and lighting was installed along with a new wooden floor and the addition of a Baptistry.

Fittings

The octagonal stone pulpit stands on a pedestal against the north wall. It was probably donated by the Mede family who lived at Failand Hill and carries their family crest. The Medes were also associated with St Mary Redcliffe, with Thomas Mede holding office as High Sheriff of Bristol and Member of Parliament for Bristol in the 15th century.

The font has various devices on its side panels including a Tudor rose and the five Holy Wounds. A specific pew was set aside for the owners of Nailsea Court.

Organ

The church has a two manual pipe organ by Sweetland Organ Company.

See also

 List of Grade I listed buildings in North Somerset
 List of towers in Somerset
 List of ecclesiastical parishes in the Diocese of Bath and Wells

Gallery

References

15th-century church buildings in England
Church of England church buildings in North Somerset
Grade I listed churches in Somerset
Grade I listed buildings in North Somerset
Holy Trinity